Tílos is a small Greek island and municipality located in the Aegean Sea. It is part of the Dodecanese group of islands, and lies midway between Kos and Rhodes. It has a population of 780 inhabitants (2011 census).In 2022 the island haw population of 745 people. Tilos is part of the Rhodes regional unit.

Popularly, Telos was the son of Helios and Halia, the sister of the Telchines. He came to the island in search of herbs to heal his ill mother, and later returned to found a temple to Apollo and Neptune. However, Telos (Telo or Tilo) does not appear in Greek mythology and the name probably has an unknown pre-Hellenic origin. Pliny the Elder notes that in antiquity Telos was known as Agathussa (Αγαθούσσα) (also Agathusa and Agathousa). In the Middle Ages, it was known by the Italian as Episcopio, either because it was a Bishop Seat or because its position as Vantage Point.  The island has also been called in Turkish İlyaki and in modern Italian Piscopi.

History

Neolithic
Pottery and stone tools discovered in Charkadio cave indicate human activity on Tilos in the early Neolithic period (8000 BC to 7000 BC), along with the large assembly of bones of  dwarf elephants, carbon dated to between 4000 and 7000 BC (some now in the museum). Masseti (2001) suggests coexistence of these animals with humans, possibly into the historic period.

Aegean Bronze Age
Excavation has identified Pelasgian masonry, as well as suggesting Tilos was successively dominated by Minoans, Mycenaeans and Dorians.

Classical antiquity

The island flourished during the classical era, minting its own coinage and being famed for clothing and perfumes.
Telos claims that poet Erinna (said to be Sappho's equal) was born on the island around 350 BC. Charles Anthon (1853) describes her thus: "Erinna (Ήριννα) friend & contemporary of Sappho (about 612 BC) died at 19, left behind her poems which were thought worthy to rank with those of Homer. Her poems were of the epic class; the chief of them was entitled Ήλακάτη, " The Distaff" it consisted of three hundred lines, of which only four are extant. It was written in a dialect which was a mixture of the Doric and Aeolic, and which was spoken at Rhodes, where, or in the adjacent island of Telos, Erinna was born. She is also called a Lesbian and a Mytilenean, on account of her residence in Lesbos with Sappho. There are several epigrams upon Erinna, in which her praise is celebrated, and her untimely death is lamented. Three epigrams in the Greek Anthology are ascribed to her, of which the first has the genuine air of antiquity, but the other two, addressed to Baucis, seem to be a later fabrication."
In the 7th century BC, colonists from Tilos and Lindos settled in Sicily and founded the city of Gelas.
 Herodotus (484 BC – c. 425 BC) described the centuries preceding him as the golden age of Tilos.
In the 5th century BC, Tilos was a member of the First Delian League and kept its independence until the end of the Peloponnesian War.
From the turn of the 4th century BC, for the next 200 years, Tilos was subject to the Seleucid Empire, Caria and then Ptolemaic Egypt under the influence of Rhodes, until in 200 BC, the island was incorporated into the Rhodian confederacy.
The island was conquered by the Romans in 42 BC. Archaeological finds from Roman and early-Christian times demonstrate the prosperity of the island until the 551 Beirut earthquake.

Byzantine
Tilos followed Rhodes into the Byzantine Empire, following the death of Theodosius I, and was a member of the naval Theme of Samos between the 9th and 14th century.

Crusaders

The Knights of Saint John took control of Tilos from 1309, restoring the Byzantine castles, and building new ones in order to defend against pirate raids. It was evacuated in 1470 as the Ottomans began the Siege of Rhodes and control passed to Suleiman I in 1522 when Rhodes fell.

Ottoman

In 1523, Tilos was conquered by the Ottoman Empire and the island was put under the privileged administrative and tax system known as "maktou." Christian pirates pillaged the island constantly.

20th Century

Ottoman rule lasted until May 12, 1912, when Italian sailors landed in the bay of Eristos during the Italo-Turkish War.  Tilos then became part the Italian possession of the Isole Italiane dell'Egeo.  After the Italian Armistice of September 8, 1943, Tilos was occupied by German troops, and in 1948 it joined Greece together with all the Dodecanese islands. Since 1948, the population of the island has declined rapidly, as many Tilians migrated to the United States or Australia.

In June 2008, Anastassios Aliferis, the Socialist mayor of the island performed the first same-sex marriages in Greece, citing a legal loophole and defying claims of illegality by a Greek prosecutor.

In late 2018 Tilos will become the first island in the Mediterranean to run exclusively on wind and solar power.

Geography

The island has a mountainous limestone interior, volcanic lowlands, pumice beds and red lava sand, like its north western neighbour Nisyros. It is well supplied by springs, and is potentially very fertile and productive. Its coasts are generally rocky or pebbled, but there are also a number of sandy beaches.

Climate
Tilos has a mediterranean climate, typical for the region.

Landmarks

At the north-west end of the island, the Monastery of Áyios Pandeleímon, (also the island's patron saint), sits on the slopes of Mount Profítis Ilías (654 m). The monastery features fresh cold water springs as well as an enormous loquat tree (called Musmulla in Greek).  The mountain borders a fertile plain running across the island's width, with the settlements of Áyios Andónis to the north and Éristos to the south. To the north-east of the plain is the island's capital, Megálo Chorió, built in the early 19th century at the foot of the ancient city of Telos. The archaic ruins stretch up to the site of the acropolis of the ancient city, dedicated to Pythios Apollo and Poliada Athina, and the Venetian Kástro, built over it. To the west is Kharkhadió Cave, where excavations in 1971 unearthed Neolithic finds and bones of dwarf elephant.

Above the cave stand the ruins of the medieval Fortress of Mesariá. At southern end of the island, bordered by more fertile meadows, is Livádhia, the major harbour and economic centre of the island. The island's old capital, Mikró Chorió, first settled in the 15th century by the Knights of the Order of St John, overlooks the bay. It has been completely abandoned since 1960, its inhabitants having moved down to the harbour in the 1930s. A number of other settlements such as Lethrá, Gherá, and Panó Méri have similarly been abandoned. Mount Áyios Nikoláos (367 m) stands to the south of the bay.

Castles
Kástros (castles) have protected the island's inhabitants from pirate raids since the Dark Ages.
Megálo Chorió
Mesariá
Mikró Chorió
Agrosikiá
Stavroú Lámbrou

Power grid 
Tilos has an undersea cable connecting it to Kos via Nisiros. This struggled to cope with the large summer population, and frequently failed. This has been reinforced with solar power, wind turbines and a battery farm, making Tilos self-sufficient with fully renewable electricity.

Notes

References

External links 
 Official website 
 Tilos Park 

Islands of Greece
Ports and harbours of Greece
Dodecanese
Municipalities of the South Aegean
Populated places in Rhodes (regional unit)
Landforms of Rhodes (regional unit)
Islands of the South Aegean
Members of the Delian League
Greek city-states
Populated places in the ancient Aegean islands